Mandy Versteegt (born 23 February 1990) is a former Dutch footballer. She played as a striker for BeNe League club AFC Ajax and the Netherlands national team.

Club career
She played for FC Utrecht in the Eredivisie before moving to AFC Ajax in 2012 to play in the first season of the BeNe League. She retired from football aged 26 after losing interest in football.

International career
Versteegt made her first appearance for the senior Netherlands women's national football team on 15 February 2012, a 2–1 friendly defeat to France in Nîmes.

She was called up to be part of the national team for the UEFA Women's Euro 2013.

Honours

Club
FC Utrecht
Winner
  KNVB Women's Cup: 2009–2010

References

External links
Profile at vrouwenvoetbalnederland.nl (in Dutch)
 
 
 Profile at fussballtransfers.com 
 Profile at soccerdonna.de 

1990 births
Living people
People from Woerden
Dutch women's footballers
Netherlands women's international footballers
AFC Ajax (women) players
Eredivisie (women) players
FC Utrecht (women) players
Sportlust '46 players
Women's association football forwards
Footballers from Utrecht (province)